Lynden Antonio Trail (born March 19, 1991) is an American football linebacker who is currently a free agent. He was signed as an undrafted free agent by the Houston Texans in 2015. He played college football at Norfolk State University. 

He was also member of the Washington Redskins and Los Angeles Rams. He has a wife and three children.

Professional career

Houston Texans
After going unselected in the 2015 NFL Draft, Trail signed with the Houston Texans. On September 11, 2015, the team released him with an injury settlement.

Washington Redskins
Trail was signed to the Washington Redskins’ practice squad on October 5, 2015. He was released on October 12 but was re-signed back to the team's practice squad on November 23, 2015.

Trail signed a futures contract with the Redskins on January 11, 2016. On September 3, 2016, Trail was waived by the Redskins, but was re-signed with their practice squad a day later. The team waived him again on September 19.

Los Angeles Rams
The Los Angeles Rams signed Trail to their practice squad on September 27, 2016. He was released on October 1, 2016.

Second stint with Redskins
On December 22, 2016, Trail was re-signed to the Redskins' practice squad, and was promoted to the active roster the following day.

On September 2, 2017, Trail was waived/injured by the Redskins and placed on injured reserve. The team released him with an injury settlement on September 7, 2017.

Hamilton Tiger-Cats
In early 2018, Trail took part in The Spring League, a developmental minor league football organization which highlights young talent for NFL and CFL scouts. Following his participation in The Spring League, Trail was signed by the Hamilton Tiger-Cats on May 5.

Atlantic City Blackjacks
On April 2, 2019, Trail was assigned to the Atlantic City Blackjacks.

Personal life 
Trail is Catholic.

References

External links
NSU Spartans bio
Washington Redskins bio

1991 births
Living people
Players of American football from Miami
Booker T. Washington Senior High School (Miami, Florida) alumni
Washington Redskins players
American football linebackers
Houston Texans players
Norfolk State Spartans football players
Los Angeles Rams players
The Spring League players
Atlantic City Blackjacks players
African-American Catholics
Players of Canadian football from Miami